The Hang Jebat Mausoleum is the mausoleum of Hang Jebat located in Melaka City, Melaka, Malaysia.

History
The actual age of the grave is unknown but it predates back to Portuguese Malacca in 1511.

Architecture
The grave was made with Acehnese style with the type of normally used to mark the burial places of high ministers or Sultans during the Malacca Sultanate. His grave is surrounded by other unnamed old tombs.

See also
 List of tourist attractions in Malacca

References

Buildings and structures in Malacca City
Mausoleums in Malacca